Adderstone with Lucker is a civil parish in Northumberland, England.  The parish includes the villages of Adderstone, Lucker, Warenford, Rosebrough, Newstead, Bellshill and Bradford, and has a population (2001) of 195. increasing to 238 at the 2011 Census.

History 
The parish was formed on 1 April 1955 from the parishes of Adderstone, Bradford, Lucker, Newstead, Ratchwood and Warenford.

References

External links 

Local history

Civil parishes in Northumberland